Bucktown, USA is a 1975 American crime action blaxploitation film released by American International Pictures starring Fred Williamson.

Plot

Fred Williamson stars as Duke Johnson, a man who arrives in Bucktown to bury his brother, a bar owner who was killed after refusing to pay crooked cops for protection. After arriving in Bucktown, he realizes he needs help after being threatened himself. Duke calls his friend Roy (Thalmus Rasulala) and his gang to come and help. But, after arriving, Roy's gang decided to take over the town, themselves. In order to prevent this, Duke has to fight off Roy's gang all by himself.

Cast
 Fred Williamson as Duke Johnson
 Pam Grier as Aretha
 Thalmus Rasulala as Roy
 Tony King as T.J.
 Bernie Hamilton as Harley
 Art Lund as Chief Patterson
 Tierre Turner as Steve
 Carl Weathers as Hambone
 Morgan Upton as Sam
 Jim Bohan as Clete

Music
The film's score was written by Johnny Pate, and its main theme sung by Luther Rabb. The soundtrack was released by American International Records.

Reception
The New York Times reviewer Vincent Canby gave the film a negative review, calling it "really bad" and "both silly and vicious," though he praised the performances of Williamson and Grier, saying the two "display enough of their own private wit to save the movie from seeming to be quite the mess it is."

In a 2012 interview, director Arthur Marks described the film as "a big success," noting that Samuel Arkoff's American International Pictures saw the film and wanted to distribute it (Marks had previously distributed through his own General Film Corporation). He claimed, "it made back its initial cost very quickly, and played every inner-city in the North. It was making --playing the State Lake Theater in Chicago-- at [sic] $60,000 and 70,000 a week." Mark's work with AIP on the film led to their distributing his subsequent films.

Release
Bucktown has been released on DVD by MGM and blu-ray, most recently in 2019 by Scorpion Releasing.

Remake
Bucktown was loosely remade as the film Full Clip (2004). Williamson also borrowed heavily from the film's plot for his 1996 film Original Gangstas, which also co-starred Grier.

See also
 List of American films of 1975

References

External links

1975 films
Blaxploitation films
1970s crime drama films
United Artists films
American crime drama films
African-American films
Films directed by Arthur Marks
1975 drama films
1970s English-language films
1970s American films